Sammy Gallop (March 16, 1915 – February 24, 1971) was an American lyricist, known for his big band and swing songs of the 1940s and 1950s.

Biography 
Gallop was born in Duluth, Minnesota.  He originally worked as a surveyor and draftsman.  On February 24, 1971, Gallop committed suicide in Encino, California. Some records mentioned his name as Gallup.

Works 
 "Caribbean Clipper" (music by Jerry Gray) 
 "Count Every Star" (music by Bruno Coquatrix)
 "The Clock in the Tower" (music by Guy Wood)
 "Elmer's Tune" (music by Elmer Albrecht and Dick Jurgens)
 "Forgive My Heart" (music by Chester Conn)
 "Half As Lovely Twice As True" (music by Lew Spence)
 "Holiday for Strings" (music by David Rose)
 "Maybe You'll Be There" (music by Rube Bloom) 
 "My Lady Loves to Dance" (music by Milton DeLugg)
 "No Good Man" (music by Dan Fisher and Irene Higginbotham)
 "The Sentimental Touch" (music by Albert Van Dam)
 "Shoo Fly Pie and Apple Pan Dowdy" (music by Guy Wood)
 "Somewhere along the Way" (music by Kurt Adams)
 "There Must Be a Way" (music by David Saxon)
 "Uninvited Dream" (music by Burt Bacharach)
 "Wake the Town and Tell the People" (music by Jerry Livingston)
 "Way I Feel About You" (music by Doc Severinsen and Tommy Newsom)
 "You're Gonna Hate Yourself in the Mornin'" (music by Larry Stock and Ira Schuster)

References 

1915 births
1971 suicides
American lyricists
Suicides in California